Menatetrenone (INN), also known as MK-4, is one of the nine forms of vitamin K2.

MK-4 is produced via conversion of vitamin K1 in the body, in the testes, pancreas and arterial walls. While major questions still surround the biochemical pathway for the transformation of vitamin K1 to MK-4, studies demonstrate the conversion is not dependent on gut bacteria, occurring in germ-free rats and in parenterally-administered K1 in rats. Tissues that accumulate high amounts of MK-4 have a capacity to convert up to 90% of the available K1 into MK-4.

Dose
Bioavailability studies have shown that small oral doses are not detected in the blood – for example 420 mcg of menatetrenone or less tested over minutes and hours are not detectable, and larger doses in the order of milligrams are required, unlike vitamin K2 MK-7 which is detectable in the blood in mcg doses. Furthermore, "administered daily doses of 15, 45, 90, and 135 mg revealed that 45 mg was the minimum effective dose for improving bone mass parameters evaluated by microdensitometry and/or single photon absorptiometry in postmenopausal women with osteoporosis".

References 

1,4-Naphthoquinones
Diterpenes
Vitamin K